Friedrich Höricke (born 1963) is a German pianist and composer.

Life 
Born in Cologne, Höricke played his first piano recital in Cologne at the age of eleven. At the age of thirteen he was already accepted as the youngest student in the master class of Günter Ludwig at the Hochschule für Musik Köln. At the same time he attended the Cologne . At the age of 18 he won first prize at the Tomassoni Competition of the Cologne Academy of Music, as well as a prize at the Ferruccio Busoni International Piano Competition. Further training followed at the Curtis Institute of Music in Philadelphia, where he was taught by Jorge Bolet, Gary Graffman, Mieczysław Horszowski and Seymour Lipkin. First prize at the Philadelphia Young Artists Competition followed, as well as concert engagements in America, Asia, Western, Central and Eastern Europe. He subsequently released CDs, increasingly with his own compositions for piano, or for piano and orchestra.

In 1985, Höricke married the sexologist Shere Hite in New York City, where they lived together in a flat on 5th Avenue. Later Höricke and Hite moved to Germany, where they took a flat in Cologne. In 1999 the couple divorced.

Style 
As a composer and pianist, Höricke feels obliged to the tradition of the great composing piano virtuosos. He tries to take up their lines of tradition and integrates his own piano works as well as his own transcriptions of foreign works into his concert programmes. Thus his concert suite from the Stone Flower, Sergei Prokofiev's last ballet, can sometimes be heard. In 2004, his piano concerto was premiered at the Saint Petersburg Philharmonic.

Among other things, he is dedicated to the rediscovery of Ignaz Friedman.

Recordings 
 Die lustigen Weiber von Windsor – and others pieces by Otto Nicolai. Delta Music, Frechen 1998. (Capriccio 10592)
 Love & Passion –  Leidenschaftliche Klavierwerke mit Gedanken von Shere Hite. Kompositionen unter anderem von Liszt, Rachmaninoff, Gershwin, and Debussy. EastWest Records, Hamburg 1998. (Red Moon 3984-25 187-2)
 Friedrich Höricke spielt Beethoven – Sonata No. 28 A major and Sonata No. 30 E major and Variations and Fugue op. 35. Bella Musica, Bühl 1995. (Antes Edition BMCD 31.9038)
 Serge Rachmaninoff – Sonata Nr. 2, op. 36. Dabringhaus und Grimm, Detmold 1994. (MDG 611 0547-2)

References

External links 
 
 Informationen zu Friedrich Höricke, unter anderem Biographie, Interview, Diskographie und Presse.
 

German classical pianists
20th-century German composers
21st-century German composers
1963 births
Living people
Musicians from Cologne